Niña Bonita may refer to:

 "Niña Bonita" (song), a song by Chino & Nacho
 Niña Bonita (album), a 1996 album by Patricia Manterola
 Niña Bonita (telenovela), a 1988 Venezuelan telenovela

See also
 Mi Niña Bonita, a 2010 album by Chino & Nacho